Robert Allison Carse (July 19, 1919 in Edmonton, Alberta – July 27, 1999) was a professional ice hockey forward who played 165 games in the National Hockey League.  He played for the Chicago Black Hawks and Montreal Canadiens of the NHL. Carse also played for the following minor league teams during his career: Providence Reds, Kansas City Americans and Edmonton Flyers.

His career was interrupted by World War II military service. In 1944, Carse was shot in the shoulder and captured by German forces. After 6 months of marching from camp to camp, Carse had lost 60 pounds from malnutrition. After returning from Europe, his rights were traded from the Black Hawks to the Canadiens.

Carse was inducted into the Cleveland Sports Hall of Fame in 1976 for his on-ice career with the Cleveland Barons, service as an AHL Linesman and the organization of the Parma Hockey Program. He was also inducted into the Cleveland Barons Hall of Fame (1971). His brother Bill Carse also played in the NHL.

References

External links 

1919 births
1999 deaths
Canadian ice hockey forwards
Canadian military personnel of World War II
Chicago Blackhawks players
Cleveland Barons (1937–1973) players
Ice hockey people from Edmonton
Kansas City Americans players
Montreal Canadiens players
Providence Reds players